Tipil can refer to the following places:

Tipil, Togo, a village in Togo
Tipil, Turkey, a village in Turkey